The Flumserberg Ladies Open is a women's professional golf tournament in the LET Access Series, held since 2014 at Gams-Werdenberg Golf Club in St. Gallen, Switzerland

Originally the tournament was named after its main sponsor, the Association Suisse des Golfeurs Indépendants (ASGI). After three seasons as the successor  sponsor, VP Bank stepped up to sponsor the Ladies European Tour event VP Bank Swiss Ladies Open, and the tournament was renamed after Flumserberg, the nearby Swiss Alps resort area.

Winners

See also
Ladies Swiss Open – Switzerland's Ladies European Tour event

References

External links

LET Access Series events
Golf tournaments in Switzerland